"Up All Night" is a song by American glam metal band Slaughter. Written by band members Mark Slaughter and Dana Strum, it was the third title on the band's debut album, Stick It to Ya, and the band's first single. It was released in 1990.

Music video
The music video was directed by Michael Bay, and was placed on New York Times list of the 15 Essential Hair-Metal Videos.

Track listing
7" single

CD single

Maxi single

Personnel
 Mark Slaughter – lead vocals, guitar, keyboards
 Tim Kelly – guitar, backing vocals
 Dana Strum – bass, backing vocals
 Blas Elias – drums, backing vocals

Charts

References

1990 singles
1990 songs
Chrysalis Records singles
Glam metal songs
Slaughter (band) songs